The Pewaukee School District is located in central Waukesha County, Wisconsin.  The district serves the village and city of Pewaukee, Wisconsin. The district has 2,584 students. Faculty and staff number 295. It twice received the Wisconsin Forward Award at the mastery level.

Schools 
 Pewaukee Lake Elementary School serves students in early childhood through 2nd grade.
 Horizon Elementary serves grades 3 to 5.
 Asa Clark Middle School (ACMS) serves grades 6 to 8. Asa Clark's sports include volleyball, basketball, football, a dance squad, wrestling, cross country, and track and field. The school's extra-curricular opportunities include Art Club, Drama Club, Forensics, Math Counts, LEGOS/Robotics, an in-house robotics club, Honors Choir, and River Keepers.

Pewaukee High School 

The school has a network of computers, smartboards, and projectors.  The school has some online classes, such as introductory C++, Java, and AP Computer Science. The foreign languages department included French, Spanish and Mandarin Chinese. Advanced Placement classes are offered.

PHS is a WIAA Division 2 school in all sports except football, in which it is a Division 3 school, and in track and field and cross country, in which it is a Division 1 school. The school has two softball fields, two football fields, a track, and two soccer fields. The Pewaukee Pirates compete in the Woodland Conference. The football team made the playoffs from 2005 to 2008. In 2021, the Pewaukee Pirates won the WIAA Division 3 state football championship against Rice Lake with a final score of 15–6. The boys' basketball team was the WIAA Division 2 State Runner-Up in 2000–2001, and has won 11 conference championships (1926, 1931, 1961, 1999, 2001, 2008, 2009, 2010, 2012, 2017, 2018). In 2008, 2012, and 2013 the dance team came in first place in state in their division. The girls' cross country team won the state meet in 2001, 2002, 2003, 2009 and 2015. The boys' cross country team won the state meet in 2015. The wrestling team has been conference champion eight consecutive years.

In Academic Decathlon, PHS is a Division 2 school. In the 2017–2018 school year, the Pewaukee High School Academic Decathlon team took third overall in the state-wide competition. The team also came first in their division, and took the state title for Division 2. Due to this success, the team had the opportunity to advance on to the national competition where the competing members were able to place third overall in their division country-wide. The 2017–2018 school year was the most successful year for the Pewaukee High School Academic Decathlon team to date. The theme for the 2017–2018 school year was Africa and focused on the history, literature, science, social science, economics, music, and art of the greater region. In the 2006–2007 school year, the team placed sixth in the state. At the 2007 state competition, the Pewaukee Academic Decathlon team ranked eighth in Wisconsin and took the state title for Division 2. In the 2007–2008 school year, when the topic was the Civil War, the team placed third overall at the state competition, winning the state division title. It also placed third in the Super Quiz Oral Relay.

On February 26, 2017, standout point guard Aidan Nordquist committed to Ripon College on scholarship. After his freshman year he left Ripon College to pursue a career in Canadian Axe Throwing. In 2020, Nordquist was suspended from the Canadian Axe Throwing League in allegations of using a corked axe.

Notable alumni
 Mel Eslyn, film producer
 Ben Landry, rugby union player
 Chris McIntosh, former offensive tackle for the Seattle Seahawks
 Derek Watt, NFL fullback for the Pittsburgh Steelers and TV Host
 J. J. Watt, NFL defensive end for the Arizona Cardinals and TV Host
 T. J. Watt, NFL linebacker for the Pittsburgh Steelers and TV Host

References

Education in Waukesha County, Wisconsin
School districts established in 1840
School districts in Wisconsin
1840 establishments in Wisconsin Territory